Street Worms is the debut studio album by Swedish post-punk band, Viagra Boys. The album was released on 28 September 2018 through YEAR0001.

Background 
Ahead of the release of the album, two singles were released: "Sports" came out in mid August 2018, and at the end of August 2018, the single "Just Like You" came out.

In an interview with The Fader, the band stated that the album is focused on discussing and criticizing hypermasculinity and right-wing populism in Europe.

Critical reception 

Street Worms was well-received by music critics. On review aggregator website, Metacritic, Street Worms received an average rating of 80 out of 100 based on four professional critic reviews, indicating "generally favorable reviews". The album received a similar score of 79 out of 100 on Album of the Year based on six reviews by professional critics.

Track listing

Personnel 
Credits adapted from the liner notes of Street Worms.

 Sebastian Murphy – vocals
 Henrik Höckert – bass
 Tor Sjödén – drums
 Oskar Carls – saxophone
 Benjamin Vallé – guitar
 Martin Ehrencrona – synth

References

External links 
 
 

2018 debut albums
Viagra Boys albums
Year0001 albums